Yalkaya is a village in the Şirvan District of Siirt Province in Turkey. The village had a population of 83 in 2021.

References 

Kurdish settlements in Siirt Province
Villages in Şirvan District